Wentworth Henry Canning Beaumont, 2nd Viscount Allendale,  (6 August 1890 – 16 December 1956) was a British peer, Lord Lieutenant of Northumberland, and army captain.

Origins
He was the son of Wentworth Beaumont, 1st Viscount Allendale by his wife Lady Alexandrina Louisa Maud Vane-Tempest.

Education
He was educated at Eton College and graduated from Trinity College, Cambridge in 1912.

Military service
Allendale was commissioned into the Territorial Force in 1912 and transferred to the 2nd Life Guards in 1913. He fought in the First World War, serving with the Guards Machine Gun Regiment, and rose the rank of Captain in 1915. From 1918 to 1919 he was an Acting Major while commanding a company.

Political career
Allendale succeeded his father in the viscountcy in 1923 was a Lord in Waiting between 1931 and 1932 in Ramsay MacDonald's ministry. From 1949 to 1956 he served as Lord-Lieutenant of Northumberland. In 1951, he was awarded an honorary doctorate of Civil Law from the University of Durham.

Marriage and children
On 20 July 1921 at St Martin-in-the-Fields Lord Allendale married Violet Lucy Emily Seely, daughter of Sir Charles Seely, 2nd Baronet, by whom he had six children:
Wentworth Hubert Charles Beaumont, 3rd Viscount Allendale (12 September 1922–27 December 2002)
Ela Hilda Aline Beaumont (27 May 1925 – 18 February 2002), married Charles Howard, 12th Earl of Carlisle.
Richard Blackett Beaumont (13 August 1926 – 2010)
Sir Edward Nicholas Canning Beaumont (14 December 1929 – 22 June 2011)
Matthew Henry Beaumont (10 April 1933 – 16 December 2017)
George Andrew Beaumont (21 June 1938 – 3 January 1960)

References

External links

1890 births
1956 deaths
Alumni of Trinity College, Cambridge
British Life Guards officers
British Army personnel of World War I
Commanders of the Order of the British Empire
Companions of the Order of the Bath
Knights of the Garter
Lord-Lieutenants of Northumberland
People educated at Eton College
Permanent Lords-in-Waiting
Recipients of the Military Cross
2
Labour Party (UK) hereditary peers